Edelman Financial Engines is an American financial planning and investment advisory company. , it has $291 billion in assets and more than 1.3 million clients. The company was formed by the 2018 merger of Financial Engines (founded in 1996) and Edelman Financial Services (founded in 1986).

History

Edelman Financial Services

Edelman Financial Services, a financial advisory firm, was founded in 1986 by married couple Jean and Ric Edelman. Sanders Morris Harris Group, a publicly traded wealth management firm, purchased a majority stake of Edelman Financial Services in 2005. Sanders Morris Harris Group changed its name to Edelman Financial Group in March 2011, and Ric Edelman was named co-CEO of the company with George Ball. Private equity firm Hellman & Friedman purchased a controlling stake in Edelman Financial Services in October 2015, at which point the company was managing $15 billion in assets.

Financial Engines

Financial Engines was founded in 1996 by Nobel Prize-winning economist William Sharpe, Stanford Law professor Joseph Grundfest, and attorney Craig W. Johnson. In 1998, it offered its first retirement planning and fund picking software. The company launched its managed accounts offering to a small number of employers in September 2004. By December 2004, it had $1 billion in assets under management. Financial Engines acquired registered investment advisory firm The Mutual Fund Store for $560 million in 2015. By 2018, the company managed $160 billion in assets and was the largest provider of managed accounts in the defined-contribution market. The company provided 401(k) investment advice managed by a proprietary technology platform with access to human advisers. In 2018, its clients included Comcast NBCUniversal and IBM.

Edelman Financial Engines

Hellman & Friedman acquired Financial Engines in 2018 for $3 billion and merged it with Edelman Financial Services. The new firm became the largest independent registered investment adviser in the United States, managing $191 billion. Financial Engines CEO Larry Raffone became president and CEO of the combined company, while Ric Edelman was made its chairman of financial and investor education. In November 2018, the merged company announced it would operate under the name Edelman Financial Engines. One objective of the merger was to combine the companies' workplace retirement and financial planning services.

For five consecutive years between 2018 and 2022, Barron's ranked Edelman Financial Engines as the #1 registered financial advisory firm in the United States. Former Department of Labor assistant secretary Phyllis Borzi joined the company's board in November 2018. The company named Kelly O'Donnell, founder of its Women in Leadership program, as head of its workplace business in November 2019. Jason Van de Loo became head of its wealth planning business in January 2020.

As of August 2020, the company managed $291 billion in assets for more than 1.3 million clients, mostly in 401(k) plans. 

In March 2021, Edelman Financial Engines announced that Warburg Pincus would be taking a minority stake in the company. The transaction represented a valuation of $7.3 billion, a 62% increase in the company's value since its formation in 2018.

In June 2021, Edelman Financial Engines announced that Ric Edelman would step down from his role as chairman of financial education and client experience but stay on as a strategic adviser and board member. He also remains the firm's largest individual shareholder.

In January 2022, Edelman Financial Engines launched Everyday Wealth with Soledad O’Brien and Jean Chatzky, a financial and investment advice podcast hosted by Jean Chatzky and Soledad O’Brien. The weekly episodes cover personal finance, the economy, wealth management, and other financial topics.

Services

Wealth Management - Jason Van de Loo heads Edelman Financial Engines' retail wealth management. As of January 2020, the company employed 320 financial planners overseeing nearly $40 billion across 92,000 retail clients. 

Workplace - This service, managing 401(k) accounts for 1.1 million clients across 7,000 companies , is led by Kelly O'Donnell. The company is the largest provider of managed accounts in the United States, and has more clients than any other independent financial advisor. It also offers Income+, an income service for customers entering or in retirement.

Tax Planning - In May 2021, to create a new internal tax planning division, Edelman acquired Viridian Advisors, a Washington State-based financial  firm specializing in tax planning.

References

American companies established in 1946
Financial services companies established in 2018
Financial services companies based in California
Investment management companies of the United States
Privately held companies based in California